This is a list of original Xbox games that are compatible with the System Link feature, both released and unreleased.  Platinum Hits releases may not system link with non-platinum hits releases due to some Platinum Hits releases having 'Title Updates' that will not link with older versions, and some games will not link with non updated versions if they have 'Title Updates' applied, either through XBL or a softmod. For Xbox 360 games, see List of Xbox 360 System Link games. Some games allow more players if one Xbox acts as a Dedicated Server. A Dedicated Server means one of the Xbox's hosts the others and you can't play on the host Xbox.

See also
List of Xbox 360 System Link games
List of Xbox 360 games
List of Xbox games
Lists of video games

Dynamic lists
Xbox